Rhodoplanes pokkaliisoli is a Gram-negative, rod-shaped, non-sulfur  bacterium from the genus of Rhodoplanes which has been isolated from mud of a rice field on the Vypeen Island in India.

References

External links
Type strain of Rhodoplanes pokkaliisoli at BacDive -  the Bacterial Diversity Metadatabase

 

Nitrobacteraceae
Bacteria described in 2009